Wright Ice Piedmont is an ice piedmont extending westward from Lanchester Bay along the west coast of Graham Land in Antarctica. It was photographed by Hunting Aerosurveys Ltd in 1955-57 and mapped from these photos by the Falkland Islands Dependencies Survey (FIDS). It was named by the United Kingdom Antarctic Place-Names Committee (UK-APC) in 1960 for Wilbur Wright (1867–1912) and his brother Orville Wright (1871–1948), American aeronautical engineers who made the first controlled flights in a powered heavier-than-air machine on December 17, 1903.

Ice piedmonts of Graham Land
Davis Coast